Rotstein is a surname. Notable people with the surname include:

Abraham Rotstein (1929–2015), Canadian economist
Nancy-Gay Rotstein, Canadian poet and novelist
Robert Rotstein (born 1951), American attorney and novelist

See also
Rothstein